The Texas Review of Law & Politics is a legal publication whose mission is to publish "thoughtful and intellectually rigorous conservative articles--articles that traditional law reviews often fail to publish--that can serve as blueprints for constructive legal reform."
Its primary focus is the discussion and debate of contemporary social issues such as constitutional history, affirmative action, crime, federalism, and religious issues.  The Review publishes manuscripts submitted by legal practitioners, academics and students for its content.  It is published twice annually, fall and spring, and is managed and operated exclusively by current law students of the University of Texas School of Law.

See also

Collegiate Network

References

External links
Official web site of the Texas Review of Law & Politics

American law journals
English-language journals
University of Texas School of Law
Publications established in 1997
Law journals edited by students
Biannual journals
Law and public policy journals